Vamos a Bailar (Spanish, 'Let's Go to Dance') may refer to:

 "Vamos a Bailar", a song by Gipsy Kings from their eponymous album
 "Vamos a Bailar (Live)", a live version of the song from Mosaïque
 "Vamos a Bailar", a song by K-Paz de la Sierra from their album Pensando En Ti
 "Vamos a Bailar", a song by Marciano Cantero
 "Vamos a Bailar", a song by María Conchita Alonso from the Scarface soundtrack
 "Vamos a Bailar", a song by Parchís
 "Vamos a Bailar (Esta Vida Nueva)", a song by Paola e Chiara